Marie-Françoise Pérol-Dumont (born 26 May 1952) has been serving as Senator for the Haute-Vienne department since 2014.

From 2004 to 2015, she was president of the departmental council of Haute-Vienne. She was previously the vice-president of the departmental council from 1992 to 2001 and Secretary of the National Assembly from 1998 to 2004. She is a member of the Socialist Party.

References

Living people
Socialist Party (France) politicians
Deputies of the 12th National Assembly of the French Fifth Republic
Deputies of the 13th National Assembly of the French Fifth Republic
Senators of Haute-Vienne
1952 births
Members of Parliament for Haute-Vienne